Illya Pavlovych Ukhan (born 1 June 2003) is a Ukrainian football defender who plays for Kryvbas Kryvyi Rih.

Career
Born in Donetsk Oblast, Ukhan is a product of the DVUFK, Dnipro and Mariupol youth sportive school systems.

He played for FC Mariupol in the Ukrainian Premier League Reserves and made his debut for FC Mariupol in the Ukrainian Premier League as a start squad player in the losing home match against FC Shakhtar Donetsk on 10 April 2001.

References

External links
 
 

2003 births
Living people
People from Khartsyzk
Ukrainian footballers
FC Mariupol players
FC Kolos Kovalivka players
FC Kryvbas Kryvyi Rih players
Association football defenders
Ukrainian Premier League players
Sportspeople from Donetsk Oblast